Aiyalam Parameswaran Balachandran (born 25 January 1938) is an Indian theoretical physicist well known for his extensive contributions to the role of classical topology in quantum physics. He is currently an emeritus professor in the Department of Physics, Syracuse University, where he was previously the Joel Dorman Steele Professor of Physics between 1999 and 2012. He has also been a fellow of the American Physical Society since 1988 and was awarded a prize by the U.S. Chapter of the Indian Physics Association in recognition of his outstanding scientific contributions.

In 1990, Syracuse University honored him with a Chancellor's Citation for Exceptional Academic Achievement.

Early life and education

Balachandran was born on 25 January 1938 in Salem, Tamil Nadu, India. His father, Aiyalam Sundaram Parameswaran, was a chartered accountant in Pierce Leslie and Company in Cochin. Balachandran had a gifted poet, Vyloppilli Sreedhara Menon, as his teacher. Balachandran completed his first two college years in Guruvayurappan College, Kozhikode, specialising in physics, chemistry and mathematics and passing the 'Intermediate Examination' with all-State distinction in 1953. He joined BSc (Hons) in Physics in the Madras Christian College, Tambaram, Chennai. Balachandran graduated from MCC in 1958.

Research
Balachandran received his PhD degree under Professor Alladi Ramakrishnan at the University of Madras. Then he joined Theoretisch Physics, University at Wien as a postdoctoral fellow under Professor Walter Thirring, subsequently at the Enrico Fermi Institute as a postdoc. In 1964, he joined the Syracuse University faculty. Balachandran's key scientific works to date include the revival of the Skyrme model which successfully describes baryons as topological solitons of meson fields and mathematical concepts such as homotopy groups and fibre bundles to problems in quantum physics. In recent, Balachandran's research has been focused on the formulation of quantum field theories on noncommutative spacetimes and investigating the emergent significance of Hopf algebras in quantum physics as generalisations of symmetry groups.

Books
A. P. Balachandran, S. G. Jo, G. Marmo, Group Theory and Hopf Algebras: Lectures for Physicists, World Scientific Publishing Co. Pte. Ltd., 2010. .
A. P. Balachandran, G. Marmo, B. S. Skagerstam, A. Stern, Classical Topology and Quantum States, World Scientific Publishing Co. Pte. Ltd., Singapore, 1991.  -- (pbk.)
A. P. Balachandran, G. Marmo, B. S. Skagerstam, A. Stern, Gauge Symmetries and Fibre Bundles : Applications to Particle Dynamics, Springer Verlag, 1983. .
A. P. Balachandran (editor), A. P. Balachandran, E. Ercolessi, G. Morandi, A.M. Srivastava, Hubbard Model and Anyon Superconductivity, World Scientific Publishing Co.  1990. .
A. P. Balachandran, S. Kurkcuoglu, S. Vaidya, Lectures on Fuzzy and Fuzzy Susy Physics, World Scientific Publishing Co.  2007. .
A. P. Balachandran, G.C. Trahern, Lectures on Group Theory for Physicists, Brill Academic Publishing, 1986. .
A. P. Balachandran (editor), Hubbard Model and Anyon Superconductivity, World Scientific Publishing Co. 1991. .

References

Syracuse University faculty
University of Madras alumni
Living people
1938 births
Madras Christian College alumni
Indian theoretical physicists
People from Salem, Tamil Nadu
Scientists from Tamil Nadu
Fellows of the American Physical Society
Indian emigrants to the United States